LRA may refer to:
 Labor Research Association, US, set up by Communist Party in 1927
 Lord's Resistance Army, a Christian rebel group in Uganda
 Lake Ridge Academy, a school in North Ridgeville, Ohio, USA
 Louisiana Recovery Authority, created after 2005 hurricanes
 Land Registration Act (disambiguation), UK Acts of Parliament
 Labour Relations Agency (Northern Ireland)
 Land Registration Authority (Philippines)
 Long-Range Aviation